Horatio Jones house is a house in Tecoma, Victoria built in or around 1920-1926 by Australian inventor, engineer and recluse Horatio Thomas Jones. The two-storied house is constructed of flattened four-gallon kerosene tins using hand-made tools.

Jones was briefly engaged to Caroline Hearst, but was invalided in the Battle of Gallipoli and broke off his engagement upon returning home. In 1920 he purchased land in the Dandenong ranges and built the home for himself and his two sisters Christina and Annie. He never married.

The home is listed on the Victorian Heritage Register and is described as a "substantially intact and rare example of shanty construction of the early twentieth century."

References

Architecture of Melbourne
Houses in Melbourne
Heritage-listed buildings in Melbourne
Buildings and structures in the Shire of Yarra Ranges